Tokusa-Ō (德佐王, ? – ?) known in Korea as Buyeo Deokjwa (扶餘德佐) was a member of the royal family of Baekje, one of the Three Kingdoms of Korea. He was the third son of the founder and first king, Onjo of Baekje.

He only appears in the Japanese records of Shinsen Shōjiroku.

According to the Shinsen Shōjiroku he is one of the earliest people of Baekje to settle in Japan and is the grandson of Dongmyeongseong of Goguryeo. Nothing else is known of his life or activities besides that he was ancestor of several clans in Japan.

Family
 Father: Onjo of Baekje - this is controversial but he is at least a descendant of Gusu.
 Mother: unknown
 Brother:  - became 2nd King of Baekje.
 Brother: name unknown
 Wife: unknown
 Children: unknown

Notes

References
 Hong, Wontack. (1994). Paekche of Korea and the Origin of Yamato Japan. Seoul: Kudara International.
 https://web.archive.org/web/20061220223926/http://gias.snu.ac.kr/wthong/
 https://web.archive.org/web/20080827190959/http://www.himemiko.info/2006/01/
 https://web.archive.org/web/20071113135549/http://www.kansai.gr.jp/culture_e/ibunka/monuments/siga/index.html

See also
List of Monarchs of Korea
History of Korea
Three Kingdoms of Korea

Baekje people
Year of birth unknown